Alyaksey Plyasunow (born 3 January 1991) is a Belarusian professional football player, who plays for Molodechno.

External links

1991 births
Living people
Sportspeople from Vitebsk
Belarusian footballers
Association football midfielders
FC Polotsk players
FC Vitebsk players
FC Slonim-2017 players
FC Granit Mikashevichi players
FC Orsha players
FC Naftan Novopolotsk players
FC Molodechno players